Paul Birch (25 May 1956 – 4 July 2012) was a British author, engineer  and scientist, who worked in radioastronomy and satellite communications, and latterly wrote full-time.

He was educated at Merchant Taylors' School, Crosby and Trinity College, Cambridge and worked for Marconi Defence Systems and Plessey Radar.

He was a former Fellow of the British Interplanetary Society.

He also notably worked on orbital rings and Supramundane Habitats.

He stood for the United Kingdom Independence Party (UKIP) in an election taking 11.3% of the vote. He was a Town Councillor in Cowes, Isle of Wight at the time of his death.

In 1982, Birch published a series of papers in the Journal of the British Interplanetary Society which described orbital rings and described a form which he called Partial Orbital Ring System (PORS).

References

External links
www.paulbirch.net
How to Move a Planet
Birch, Paul (1991). "Terraforming Venus Quickly," Journal of the British Interplanetary Society
Birch, Paul (1993). "How to Spin a Planet," Journal of the British Interplanetary Society
Orbital Rings II (zip file)

1956 births
2012 deaths
Alumni of Trinity College, Cambridge
British scientists
Councillors in the Isle of Wight
People educated at Merchant Taylors' Boys' School, Crosby
UK Independence Party politicians
British writers
Engineers from Merseyside